The 2017 SheBelieves Cup was the second edition of the SheBelieves Cup, an invitational women's soccer tournament held in the United States. It took place between March 1 and 7, 2017.

The four teams were ranked No. 1, 2, 3 and 5 in the FIFA Women's World rankings, thus making the tournament the most important friendly Cup of the year. The Algarve Cup ran in parallel as well as the Cyprus Cup. France won the tournament for the first time, winning two and drawing one of their games in the process.

Teams

Squads

Format
The four invited teams played a round-robin tournament.

Points awarded in the group stage followed the standard formula of three points for a win, one point for a draw and zero points for a loss.

Venues

Standings

Results
All times are local (UTC−5).

Final standings

Goalscorers
2 goals

 Camille Abily

1 goal

 Jordan Nobbs
 Ellen White
 Marie-Laure Delie
 Eugénie Le Sommer
 Wendie Renard
 Anja Mittag
 Lynn Williams

References

External links
2017 SheBelieves Cup – Tournament

2017
2017 in women's association football
2017 in sports in New Jersey
2017 in sports in Pennsylvania
2017 in sports in Washington, D.C.
2017 in American women's soccer
2016–17 in French women's football
2016–17 in English women's football
2016–17 in German women's football
SheBelieves Cup
Soccer in Washington, D.C.
Soccer in Pennsylvania
Soccer in New Jersey